Eyvind Johan-Svendsen (5 January 1896 – 10 October 1946)  was a Danish stage and film actor.

Biography
He worked in Danish theatre between 1917 and 1939 and appeared at the Det Kongelige Teater (the Royal Danish Theatre) in Copenhagen from 1926 to 1939. He starred in his first film, the religious film Præsten i Vejlby, in 1931.

Eyvind Johan-Svendsen's father was the Norwegian composer and conductor Johan Svendsen, who was Principal Conductor at the Det Kongelige Teater from 1883 to 1908, and his mother was Juliette Haase.

Selected filmography 
Grønkøbings glade gavtyve - (1925) 
Præsten i Vejlby - 1931
Hotel Paradis - 1931
7-9-13 - 1934
Tyrannens fald - 1942
Møllen - 1943
Det brændende spørgsmål - 1943
Otte akkorder - 1944
Brevet fra afdøde - 1946

See also
 Johan Svendsen

External links
 

20th-century Danish male actors
Danish male stage actors
Danish male film actors
Danish male silent film actors
Male actors from Copenhagen
1896 births
1946 deaths